Uncensored was an annual professional wrestling pay-per-view (PPV) event from World Championship Wrestling (WCW) held in the month of March from 1995 through 2000. It was replaced by Greed in 2001.

The recurring concept of Uncensored was that it was an event that, in storylines, the (fictional) WCW Board of Directors had washed their hands of. Thus, each match on the card was ostensibly unsanctioned, meaning they were not subject to the normal rules of WCW-sanctioned wrestling matches. In reality, it was a normally-booked WCW show, albeit one with a tendency to feature more gimmick matches than usual. This notion, however, was downplayed during the last few years that it was part of the WCW PPV schedule. Hulk Hogan was featured in the main event of all six versions of the event. In 2014, All WCW pay-per-views were made available on the WWE Network.

Events

References

 
Recurring events established in 1995
Recurring events disestablished in 2000